is a private university, located in the city of Fukushima, Japan.

History
The predecessor of Fukushima College was opened as a Higher Dressmaking School in 1941. It became the Midorigaoka Women's Junior College in 1966 and was renamed the Fukushima Women's Junior College in 1968. In 2000, the college became coeducational, and was renamed the Fukushima Gakuen Junior College. In 2003, the school was renamed Fukushima College.  The associate Fukushima College Junior College was opened in 2004.

Academic Departments and Facilities

Graduate 
Graduate School of Clinical Psychology

Undergraduate 
Department of Social Welfare and Psychology

External links

   

1941 establishments in Japan
Educational institutions established in 1941
Private universities and colleges in Japan
Universities and colleges in Fukushima Prefecture
Fukushima (city)